Pigi is a village located in the Famagusta District of Cyprus,  south of Lefkoniko, in the Mesaoria plain. The name means "water well". Pigi  is under the de facto control of Northern Cyprus. According to Northern Cyprus, Pigi is part of Peristeronopigi.

References

Communities in Famagusta District
Populated places in Gazimağusa District